Battle of the Windmill National Historic Site marks the site of the November 1838 Battle of the Windmill, fought around a grist windmill near Prescott, Ontario, Canada. In 1873, the original grist windmill was converted into a lighthouse by the Canadian Department of Marine. The lighthouse became known as Windmill Point Light.

In 1996 the Friends of Windmill Point opened the 60-foot-tall stone lighthouse tower to the public as Battle of the Windmill National Historic Site, a National Historic Site of Canada. Visitors are led on a guided tour of the tower, and can climb to the top just below the lantern room for a view of the St. Lawrence River. There are interpretive panels about the battle, a video presentation, and a gift shop. The tower is open weekends in June and September, and daily in July and August, and is located on Windmill Point Road, off Highway 2, 3 km east of the town of Prescott, Ontario.

See also
Fort Wellington National Historic Site

References

Graves, Donald E., Guns Across the River: The Battle of the Windmill, 1838, 2001, The Friends of Windmill Point, Prescott, Ontario.

External links
Battle of the Windmill National Historic Site - Parks Canada official site
Windmill Point Light Lighthousefriends.com

National Historic Sites in Ontario
Museums in Leeds and Grenville United Counties
the Windmill National Historic Site
History museums in Ontario
History of Leeds and Grenville United Counties